The 2008–09 CONCACAF Champions League Group Stage took place between 16 September 2008 and 26 November 2008.

Tie-breaking criteria 

If two teams are tied on points, the following tie-breaking criteria shall be applied, in order, to determine the ranking of teams:

 Greater number of points earned in matches between the teams concerned
 Greater goal difference in matches between the teams concerned
 Greater number of goals scored away from home in matches between the teams concerned
 Reapply first three criteria if two or more teams are still tied
 Greater goal  difference in all group matches
 Greater number of goals scored in group matches
 Greater number of goals scored away in all group matches
 Drawing of lots

Groups 

All times local

Group A 

Cruz Azul is ranked ahead of Saprissa based on head-to-head record, which is the first tiebreaker.

 The Marathón – Saprissa match originally scheduled for 23 October 2008 was rescheduled for 5 November 2008 due to flooding in San Pedro Sula.

Group B 

 The Houston Dynamo – Luis Ángel Firpo match originally scheduled for 17 September 2008 was rescheduled for 26 November 2008 due to the effects of Hurricane Ike.

Group C 

Atlante is ranked ahead of Montreal Impact based on head-to-head record, which is the first tiebreaker.

Group D 

Puerto Rico Islanders is ranked ahead of Tauro based on head-to-head record, which is the first tiebreaker.

References 

Group Stage, 2008-09 Concacaf Champions League